Duke William of Württemberg (20 July 1828 – 5 November 1896) was an Austrian and Württemberg General.

Early life and family
Duke William was born at Carlsruhe, Kingdom of Prussia (now Pokój, Poland) was the first child  of Duke Eugen of Württemberg (1788–1857, son of Duke Eugen of Württemberg and Princess Louise of Stolberg-Gedern) by his second marriage to Princess Helene of Hohenlohe-Langenburg (1807–1880, daughter of Charles Louis, Prince of Hohenlohe-Langenburg and Countess Amalie Henriette of Solms-Baruth). William had three half-siblings by his father's previous marriage with Princess Mathilde of Waldeck and Pyrmont. He was the first member of the House of Württemberg to attend a public high school in Breslau.

Military career

War service
After studying in Geneva and Bonn, he joined the Austrian Army in 1848 as a lieutenant for Infantry Regiment Kaiser Franz Joseph No. 1 in Vienna. During the First Italian War of Independence (1848–1849) he was wounded several times. In recognition of his bravery, Field Marshal Joseph Radetzky von Radetz promoted him to captain in the infantry regiment No. 45.

In 1853 he became major, between 1857 and 1859 colonel lieutenant, and colonel and commander of the infantry regiment No. 27 King of the Belgians. He fought also at the Second Italian War of Independence (1859). At the Battle of Magenta, he impressed both his superiors, Major General Wilhelm Ramming and Field Marshal Lieutenant Eduard Clam-Gallas and his opponents. The French generals Gustave Lannes de Montebello and Pierre Louis Charles de Failly mentioned this a few weeks later in a meeting against the Field Marshal Lieutenant Prince of Hesse.

In 1866 he took part in the Austro-Prussian War as a major general, his brigade was assigned to the Northern Army and fought in the Battles of Königgrätz, Swiepwalde, Blumenau and Bratislava.

After the campaign, he arrived with his brigade in Trieste, in 1869 he was made commander of 11th Infantry Division troops in Prague and on 24 October 1869 he was promoted to lieutenant field marshal. During the Franco-Prussian War William fought on the German side against France. He also fought in the Russian-Turkish war in 1878.

Bosnia and Herzegovina
In 1878, during the Austro-Hungarian occupation of Bosnia and Herzegovina, he fought (again on the Austrian side) at Rogelj and Jajce. Due to his excellent performances, Emperor Franz Joseph I appointed him Feldzeugmeister and commanding general of the 18th Army Corps. His task was to submit to the west and bring peace to Bosnia. In 1878 he was commissioned to organize the newly established Condominium of Bosnia and Herzegovina militarily and politically. He served as Governor of Bosnia and Herzegovina from 1878 to 1881.

He developed the military and economic interests to be taken into account plan, a large number of communication routes.  The school system, especially the militarily organized Knabenpensionat in Sarajevo, developed in short time, as well as all other branches of administration and justice.

Later years
In 1883 William was the commanding general of the XI. Corps in Lemberg. In 1889 he became commander of the 3rd Armeekorps in Graz. In 1891 he retired from the military because of the death of King Charles I of Württemberg. As the late king's successor William II had no son, William became the heir presumptive to the throne of Württemberg.

William was Württemberg General of the Infantry à la suite of the Grenadier Regiment "King Karl" (5 Wurttemberg) No. 123 and the Royal Colonel of the Prussian Infantry Regiment of Herwarth Bittenfeld (1st Westphalian) No. 13.

As a member of the House of Württemberg, he was a member of the Estates of Württemberg.

Death
William died unmarried and without issue. The consequences of war injuries and a car accident in Italy affected his health. He died during a vacation in Tyrol.

Honours and awards

Ancestry

Literature

The Royal House of Stuart, London, 1969, 1971, 1976, Addington, A. C., Reference: 223
L'Allemagne dynastique, Huberty, Giraud, Magdelaine, Reference: II 525
R. Zerelik in: Sönke Lorenz, Dieter Mertens, Volker Press (Eds.): The House of Wuerttemberg. A biographical dictionary. Kohlhammer Verlag, Stuttgart 1997, S. 370–371.
Frank Raberg: Manual of the Württemberg State Parliament from 1815 to 1933. Biographical Kohlhammer Verlag, Stuttgart 2001, p. 1051st
Franz Ilwof: Nicolaus Wilhelm, Duke of Württemberg. In General German Biography (ADB). Band 43, Duncker & Humblot, Leipzig 1898, S. 213–218. Volume 43, Duncker & Humblot, Leipzig 1898, p. 213-218.
Constantin von Wurzbach : Württemberg, Wilhelm Nicolaus Duke of, In: Biographical Encyclopedia of the Empire Austria, Volume 58 (1889), published by LC Zamarski, Vienna, 1856–1891, p. 253-258

References

Governors of Bosnia and Herzegovina
Dukes of Württemberg (titular)
Generals of Infantry of Württemberg
Austro-Hungarian Army officers
1828 births
1896 deaths
People from Namysłów County
People from the Province of Silesia
Knights Cross of the Military Order of Maria Theresa
Grand Crosses of the Order of Saint Stephen of Hungary
Recipients of the Pour le Mérite (military class)
Recipients of the Military Merit Cross (Mecklenburg-Schwerin), 1st class
Austrian military personnel of the Second Schleswig War
Non-inheriting heirs presumptive